Xylophanes lissyi is a moth of the  family Sphingidae. It is known from Peru.

References

lissyi
Moths described in 2001
Endemic fauna of Peru
Moths of South America